is a Japanese politician of the Liberal Democratic Party, a member of the House of Representatives in the Diet (national legislature).

Affiliated to the openly revisionist lobby Nippon Kaigi, Shindo is known for his committed stance on territorial disputes with neighboring countries of Japan, and his recurring visits to the controversial Yasukuni shrine.

Early life and education
A native of Kawaguchi, Saitama, Shindo was born on 20 January 1958. His mother, Takako Shindō, was a daughter of Tadamichi Kuribayashi, a general of the Imperial Japanese Army. He studied literature at Meiji University and graduated in 1981.

Career
Shindo had worked in the city government of Kawaguchi since 1980 and had served in the assembly of Kawaguchi since 1991. He joined the Liberal Democratic Party and part of the Nukaga faction. He was elected to the House of Representatives for the first time in 1996. In 2002, he was appointed parliamentary secretary for foreign affairs.

He lost his seat in 2003, but was re-elected in 2005 from the Saitama Prefecture District 2. Shindo was named as the vice minister of trade in 2006. In the general elections on 16 December 2012, he was again elected from the Saitama Prefecture District 2. He was appointed minister of internal affairs and communications in the cabinet of Shinzō Abe on 26 December 2012.

Shindo is head of a kindergarten in his hometown.

References

1958 births
Government ministers of Japan
Liberal Democratic Party (Japan) politicians
Living people
Members of Nippon Kaigi
Members of the House of Representatives (Japan)
Meiji University alumni
People from Kawaguchi, Saitama
Ministers of Internal Affairs of Japan
21st-century Japanese politicians
20th-century Japanese people